The Roca Formation (or Roca Shale) is an early Permian geologic formation (Wolfcampian) with its exposure running north and south through Kansas and extending into Nebraska and Oklahoma, notably comprising varicolored black, brown, gray, green, red, and blue shales, mudstones, and limestone, some of which representing Permian paleosols.

See also

 List of fossiliferous stratigraphic units in Kansas
 List of fossiliferous stratigraphic units in Nebraska
 List of fossiliferous stratigraphic units in Oklahoma
 Paleontology in Kansas
 Paleontology in Nebraska
 Paleontology in Oklahoma

References

Permian geology of Oklahoma
Permian Kansas
Permian geology of Nebraska